Aimee Sian Morgans  is a British engineer who is Professor of Mechanical Engineering at Imperial College London. Her research considers thermoacoustic instabilities. She was elected Fellow of the Royal Academy of Engineering in 2021.

Early life and education 
Morgans studied engineering at the University of Cambridge, where she earned a master's of arts, a master's of engineering and a doctorate. Her doctoral research considered transonic helicopter noise.

Research and career 
In 2007, Morgans joined the faculty at Imperial College London. Morgans works on ways to make energy generation and transportation more environmentally friendly. In particular, she has concentrated on thermoacoustic instability and aerodynamic drag. In 2013, Morgans was awarded a European Research Council (ERC) Starting Grant to study the emissions of gas turbines. The combustion that occurs within gas turbines (for example those found in jet engines and power plants) produces emissions that can cause air pollution, but efforts to mitigate these emissions results in combustion instabilities. These instabilities occur due to unsteady burning of gases, which creates sound waves within the gas turbines that eventually damage the engines. These instabilities would limit the operational lifetimes of gas turbines, meaning that low emission turbines are not used in any meaningful capacity. Morgans looks to develop mathematical models of combustion instabilities. Her research was further supported by the European Research Council and Engineering and Physical Sciences Research Council in 2017, who awarded her a consolidator grant to translate computational predictions of thermoacoustic instabilities into industrial design. Later that year Morgans was the first woman to be made Professor in the Mechanical Engineering department at Imperial College London.

Morgans was elected a Fellow of the Royal Academy of Engineering in 2021.

Selected publications

Personal life 
Morgans is married with two children.

References 

Living people
Year of birth missing (living people)
Alumni of the University of Cambridge
Academics of Imperial College London
British engineering academics
Fellows of the Royal Academy of Engineering
Female Fellows of the Royal Academy of Engineering